Antonio Landeta y Álvarez-Valdés (born 30 November 1936) is a Spanish politician. In 1993 he was elected to the national parliament, the Congress of Deputies for Asturias district which he represented until 2000. He is the former president of the General Junta of the Principality of Asturias.

References

1936 births
Living people
Presidents of the General Junta of the Principality of Asturias
Members of the General Junta of the Principality of Asturias
People's Party (Spain) politicians
Members of the 5th Congress of Deputies (Spain)
Members of the 6th Congress of Deputies (Spain)